Diego Armando Mejía Pérez (born June 20, 1982 in San Salvador, El Salvador) is a retired Salvadoran footballer.

Club career
Mejía came through the Chelona youth academy and had a couple of seasons at Alianza before moving abroad to play for Honduran giants F.C. Motagua. After six months he returned to El Salvador to play for Once Municipal and San Salvador F.C. In 2007, he joined Mexican side Cobras.

In December 2007, that was reported that Mejía would make a comeback to football after a year long injury had prevented him from taking part in competitive games at any level. He impressed during trials at both USL First Division side Carolina RailHawks, and USL Second Division side Real Maryland in the early part of 2008, but ultimately decided to sign with the PDL team, Southern California Seahorses in the fourth division Premier Development League. He scored three goals in 11 games for them.

International career
With the El Salvador U-21 team, Mejía won the 2002 Central American and Caribbean Games.

He made his senior debut for El Salvador in a March 2001 friendly match against Panama and has earned a total of 19 caps, scoring 3 goals. He has represented his country in 3 FIFA World Cup qualification matches and played at the 2003 UNCAF Nations Cup as well as at the 2003 CONCACAF Gold Cup.

His final international game was a September 2004 World Cup qualification match against the United States.

International goals
Scores and results list El Salvador's goal tally first.

Post football
Mejía is now an athletic director in one of three FC Barcelona schools in Mexico, in the Chihuahua state.

References

External links

1982 births
Living people
Sportspeople from San Salvador
Association football forwards
Salvadoran footballers
El Salvador international footballers
2003 UNCAF Nations Cup players
2003 CONCACAF Gold Cup players
Alianza F.C. footballers
F.C. Motagua players
Once Municipal footballers
San Salvador F.C. footballers
Southern California Seahorses players
Salvadoran expatriate footballers
Expatriate footballers in Honduras
Expatriate footballers in Mexico
Expatriate soccer players in the United States
Liga Nacional de Fútbol Profesional de Honduras players
USL League Two players